Vacunagate (from vacuna (the Spanish word for "vaccine") and the suffix -gate; translatable into English as Vaccinegate) is the term used by the media to refer to the scandal that occurred in Peru over the irregular vaccinations of 487 people (mainly senior officials of the Executive Power of Peru) against COVID-19 that began on February 10, 2021. The crisis began with information dissemination that the former president Martín Vizcarra had received vaccines against the disease of the new coronavirus intended for Phase III of the clinical trials of Sinopharm in October 2020, without this being public knowledge.

Of the research teams at the two universities in charge of the study, the receipt and administration of the Sinopharm study vaccines, as well as the irregular order of 3,200 additional doses outside the clinical study, was given at the request of the medical researchers Germán Málaga and Hugo García Lescano, leader and coordinator of the research team of the Cayetano Heredia University who would have facilitated access to vaccines for senior officials, family members, and various people outside the volunteers at their headquarters of the clinical study and the direct personnel involved in it. The actions were aggravated when it was discovered that Germán Málaga administered three doses to 40 people at his headquarters, including himself and a deputy minister, irregularly and without written consent. Various university authorities vaccinated irregularly, including the rector and vice-rector, resigned as a result of the scandal. Finally, the National Institute of Health of Peru indicated the departure of the principal investigator responsible, and suspended the Cayetano Heredia University as the center for conducting new clinical trials.

Presidential candidate and economist Hernando de Soto Polar was also irregularly vaccinated. He initially denied an allegation of him being involved in the scandal, but it was exposed that he had flown illegally twice to the United States. De Soto was also detained for violating curfew and campaigning rules, and for being involved in Vacunagate on April 6, but was released the next day.

The inoculation of vaccines would have criminal consequences, as high-ranking officials of the Government of Francisco Sagasti were vaccinated, such as the Minister of Foreign Affairs Elizabeth Astete, the Minister of Health Pilar Mazzetti, the 2 Vice-Ministers of Health, and senior officials of the Foreign Ministry in the midst of negotiations with the Sinopharm laboratory for the acquisition of vaccines. Among the vaccinated officials, there are 8 members of the negotiating committee, who received the vaccine before and after the purchase process.

See also
 2017–2021 Peruvian political crisis
 Argentine COVID-19 vaccination scandal

References

2021 in Peru
2021 controversies
COVID-19 pandemic in Peru
Corruption in Peru
Impact of the COVID-19 pandemic on politics